A number of officially licensed audio productions based upon the long-running British science fiction television series  Doctor Who have been produced over the years.

The canonicity of the various audio adventures has not been confirmed. While it is a question that has vexed fans, it appears that, broadly, the BBC care little about the matter, as Doctor Who has no official canon. The first season of the new television series made no explicit references to the audio adventures, partly to keep the programme accessible to a wide audience, and partly in obedience to BBC guidelines about the relationship between public broadcasting and commercially licensed material. However, by 2013, the BBC Red Button minisode "The Night of the Doctor" referenced the Eighth Doctor's companions from the audio plays — namely Charley Pollard, C'rizz, Lucie Miller, Tamsin Drew and Molly O'Sullivan.

Audios featuring the Doctor
The first Doctor Who audio production, released on LP record in 1976, was a children's adventure entitled Doctor Who and the Pescatons by Victor Pemberton. Around this time an audio version of the televised serial Genesis of the Daleks was released on record, with specially recorded narration by Tom Baker. Both of these early releases have since been reissued on CD. The same year, Tom Baker and Elisabeth Sladen reprised their roles in an episode of the BBC Schools radio play Exploration Earth: The Time Machine.

In 1985, during a period when the series was on a sabbatical at the BBC, BBC Radio hired Colin Baker and his TV companion Nicola Bryant to reprise their TV roles for a new production called Slipback, broadcast as part of the Radio 4 children's magazine Pirate Radio Four, which received quite a bit of press fanfare, though it did not receive good reviews. It too was later released on audio tape and CD.

Doctor Who audio adventures diversified somewhat in the 1990s, when the BBC began issuing the soundtracks of 1960s-era serials on cassette and compact disc, some with added narration. These releases were usually derived from serials that were incomplete in the BBC vaults, thereby making this the only format in which fans could enjoy the entire story.

BBC Radio, meanwhile, attempted to get a new series of Doctor Who stories made for radio. Although more were planned, only two were ever completed: The Paradise of Death (1993) and The Ghosts of N-Space (1996), both written by Barry Letts and featuring Jon Pertwee, (in two of his final performances as the Third Doctor), Elisabeth Sladen and Nicholas Courtney. The Paradise of Death was broadcast on Radio 5, and after that station's re-launch as a news and sport network in 1994 it seemed that there would be no home for any sequels. However, a repeat broadcast of The Paradise of Death that year on Radio 2 proved popular — despite episode four accidentally being broadcast twice in place of episode five, necessitating episode five being delayed by a week — and the station was happy to commission the sequel, The Ghosts of N-Space, for itself.

In 1994, BBC Radio 4 in part of the series "Whatever Happened to ..?" broadcast a comedy drama entitled Whatever Happened to Susan Foreman? featuring Jane Asher as Susan Foreman and Andrew Sachs as Temmosus the Thal.

Several of the Target novelisations have been made into audiobooks narrated by actors who have appeared in the television series. For example, Peter Davison read the novelisation of Kinda.

In 1998, the Doctor Who Appreciation Society produced a collection of audio adventures entitled Cosmic Fugue 2 in aid of charity. The stories were read by Doctor Who actors Colin Baker, Elisabeth Sladen, Caroline John, Wendy Padbury and Louise Jameson and the writers included Barry Letts and Gary Russell, the latter of whom went on to produce Doctor Who audio dramas for Big Finish Productions. The BBC released a collection of audio versions of short stories featured in the book Short Trips, along with an original story, all read by Sophie Aldred and Nicholas Courtney. Following this, another two collections of audio versions of stories featured in Short Trips and More Short Trips, along with an original story on each, were released - Earth and Beyond read by Paul McGann and Out of the Darkness read by Colin Baker and Nicola Bryant.

Beginning in 1999, Big Finish Productions, under licence from the BBC, began a range of audio plays on compact disc, with one released every month starring one of the surviving actors to play the Doctor, namely the Fifth, Sixth and Seventh Doctors, with the Eighth Doctor following them in 2001. The Doctors are frequently joined in the audio plays by companions from the television series and new companions created for the audio range. Stories in the ongoing Eighth Doctor series were originally released in "seasons" of between four and six consecutive releases, but this pattern ceased after Doctor Who returned to television in 2005. In 2009, Tom Baker agreed to appear in five new audio stories for the BBC called Hornets' Nest. A second five-CD series, Demon Quest, followed in 2010, and the series Serpent Crest followed that in 2011. Also in 2011, Baker began appearing in audio plays as the Fourth Doctor for Big Finish, starting with The Fourth Doctor Boxset, a box set containing the "lost stories" submitted during Baker's time on television, "The Foe from the Future" and "The Valley of Death". CD box sets featuring the War Doctor were released between 2015 and shortly after John Hurt's death in 2017, and audio releases with the Tenth Doctor began from 2016.

Big Finish have also produced a limited series, titled Doctor Who Unbound, which explores possibilities contrary to the established mythos (for instance, "What if the Doctor had never left Gallifrey?"). The format of the Unbound series allows well-known actors such as Derek Jacobi and David Warner to play alternative versions of the Doctor. Bernice Summerfield, the Doctor's companion from the Virgin New Adventures novels, also features in her own series of audio plays; the character is voiced by Lisa Bowerman.

The BBC has extended Big Finish's licence to produce the audios until June 2025, and Big Finish's licence includes characters and storylines up to and including "The Time of the Doctor" (2013).

In 2005, six of the Eighth Doctor audio dramas were broadcast on the digital radio station BBC Radio 7 — these were Storm Warning, Sword of Orion, The Stones of Venice, Invaders from Mars, Shada (originally recorded for an animated webcast on the BBC's online service), and The Chimes of Midnight.  A new series of original Eighth Doctor dramas aired on BBC7 starting on New Year's Eve 2006, and lasted eight weeks.  They were subsequently released on CD by Big Finish. These are Blood of the Daleks, Horror of Glam Rock, Immortal Beloved, Phobos, No More Lies and Human Resources.  A second series of eight Eighth Doctor audios, from Dead London to Vengeance of Morbius, were released by Big Finish in 2008 and subsequently aired on BBC Radio 7; two more series in this line were released on CD, but have not aired on BBC7.

In 2022, BBC Sounds began airing Doctor Who: Redacted, a 10-episode podcast written by Juno Dawson and starring Charlie Craggs and Jodie Whittaker.

Non-Doctor audios
There have been licensed audio productions featuring characters and situations created for Doctor Who, but using characters other than the Doctor.

These include, from Big Finish:
 Dalek Empire, Dalek Empire II: Dalek War, Dalek Empire III, Dalek Empire IV: The Fearless and Cyberman, epic space operas about the Doctor's foes written and directed by Nicholas Briggs;
 Sarah Jane Smith, modern-day suspense stories starring Elisabeth Sladen as the intrepid journalist and former companion of the Doctor;
 Gallifrey, with Lalla Ward, Mary Tamm, Louise Jameson and John Leeson reprising their roles as Romanas I and II, Leela and K-9, respectively;
 UNIT, with a new UNIT crew, and guest-starring Nicholas Courtney as the now-retired General Sir Alistair Gordon Lethbridge-Stewart in some audios.

Non-Big Finish audio productions include:
 the Kaldor City series, produced by Magic Bullet Productions, which expands on the setting and characters created for the serial The Robots of Death and also ties in with the BBC television series Blake's 7; and
 the Faction Paradox series, about the rebel crime syndicate/voodoo cult introduced to the Doctor Who novel line by author Lawrence Miles.  The first six Faction audios were published by BBV under the title The Faction Paradox Protocols. Subsequently, Magic Bullet took over the series, using the title The True History of Faction Paradox.

See also
List of Doctor Who audio plays by Big Finish
Doctor Who audio releases

References

External links
Big Finish
Tertiary Console Room a guide to the audio dramas
Doctor Who page on BBC 7 drama site

 
Audio productions
Audiobooks based on Doctor Who